Jarkko Tapani Suo, professionally known as Lauri Tähkä (born November 9, 1973 in Vaasa, Finland), is a Finnish musician and recording artist. He was a leading member in the former band Lauri Tähkä & Elonkerjuu.

Growing up he listened to Kiss, Iron Maiden, the Finnish band Eppu Normaali, the works of Ismo Alanko as well as Kauko Röyhkä. Tähkä found his musical identity in a cross between rock and national ballads. With his cousin Simo Ralli he created "Niin kauan minä tramppaan" (I'll trek as long as), which won the "Lapuan Spelit" competition.

The Elonkerjuu band's home base was Teuva, Finland. Currently Lauri Tähkä is making a solo career. His first album, Polte, was released in October, 2011.

Discography

(For albums and singles  of Lauri Tähkä & Elonkerjuu, see discography of that article)

Albums
as Lauri Tähkä & Elonkerjuu

Solo albums

Singles
as Lauri Tähkä & Elonkerjuu
(Charting in The Official Finnish Charts) 

Others (including promotional singles / EPs)

Solo

References

External links
 Official homepage (In Finnish)

1973 births
Living people
People from Vaasa
Finnish male musicians